Gaëtan Bille (born 6 April 1988 in Soest) is a German-born Belgian former professional road bicycle racer, who rode professionally between 2009 and 2018.

Bille left  at the end of the 2013 season, and joined  for the 2014 season. In September 2015 it was announced that Bille would join  for 2016, with a focus on competing in the one-day classics and one-week stage races.

Major results

2006
 9th Overall Giro della Lunigiana
2008
 3rd Kattekoers
2010
 6th Overall Carpathia Couriers Paths
2011
 1st Zellik–Galmaarden
 1st Stage 3 Ronde de l'Oise
 4th Overall Rhône-Alpes Isère Tour
1st Stage 2
 4th Flèche Ardennaise
 6th Kattekoers
2012
 1st Grand Prix Pino Cerami
 9th Binche–Tournai–Binche
2013
 3rd Overall La Tropicale Amissa Bongo
 5th Overall Tour of Norway
 8th Grote Prijs Jef Scherens
2014
 1st  Overall Flèche du Sud
1st Stage 3
 1st Grand Prix de la ville de Pérenchies
 2nd Kattekoers
 3rd Grand Prix de Templeuve
 5th Tour du Jura
 6th Paris–Mantes-en-Yvelines
 7th Flèche Ardennaise
 10th Grand Prix de Wallonie
2015
 1st Overall Giro del Friuli-Venezia Giulia
1st Points classification
 1st Prologue Volta a Portugal
 2nd Overall Paris–Arras Tour
1st Stage 1 (TTT)
 2nd Overall Ronde van Midden-Nederland
1st Stage 1 (TTT)
 2nd Flèche Ardennaise
 3rd Overall Flèche du Sud
1st Stage 1
 3rd Overall Tour of Belgium
 4th Road race, National Road Championships
 4th Circuit de Wallonie
 4th Grand Prix de Wallonie
 6th Grote Prijs Jef Scherens
 6th Binche–Chimay–Binche
 7th Druivenkoers Overijse
 8th Grand Prix de la ville de Pérenchies
 9th Overall Circuit des Ardennes
2016
 5th Overall Circuit de la Sarthe
 9th Overall Tour de Luxembourg
 9th Grand Prix La Marseillaise
 9th Grand Prix of Aargau Canton
2018
 1st Overall Tour de la Pharmacie Centrale
1st Stage 2
 3rd Overall Grand Prix International de la ville d'Alger
1st Prologue
 8th Grand Prix de la Pharmacie Centrale
2019
 1st Stage 8b (ITT) Tour de Guadeloupe

References

External links

1988 births
Living people
People from Soest, Germany
Sportspeople from Arnsberg (region)
Belgian male cyclists